Love: And a Million Other Things is Claudia Brücken's first solo album, released in February 1991 and produced by Pascal Gabriel and Steve Nye.

The UK singles from the album were "Absolut(e)" and "Kiss Like Ether". Despite favourable reviews, neither of the singles reached the UK Top 40 ("Absolut(e)" peaked at No. 71, and "Kiss Like Ether" at No. 63), and the album itself also failed to chart. Brücken later blamed the album's lack of success on a change of managing director and the promotional team at Island Records just as she was completing the recording of the album. A third track from the album, "Fanatic (The Nail in My Soul)", was only released as a promotional 7" single in France.

Track listing

2010 re-issue

The album was re-issued on 27 September 2010 in the UK on the Cherry Red record label as a two-CD set, containing the original ten-track album on the first CD and a second CD entitled Love: And the B-sides and the Remixes.

Disc one
As original album

Disc two

References

1991 debut albums
Albums produced by Steve Nye
Albums produced by Pascal Gabriel
Island Records albums